Campus Bible Study (or CBS) was established in 1975 at the University of New South Wales by the then Anglican chaplain Phillip Jensen. CBS celebrated its 40th Anniversary in 2015, and continues to officially operate out of UNSW's Anglican Chaplaincy (similarly, there are chaplaincy groups for Muslims, Buddhists, etc.). The current Anglican Chaplain is Carl Matthei.

Overview 
During a typical week, CBS runs large public Bible-teaching meetings, many small-group Bible studies, and other training sessions in theology and ministry for students. CBS also runs three conferences per year, the largest one being Mid-Year Conference (MYC), which typically attracts 500-750 students. While officially linked to the movement of Sydney Anglicans, Campus Bible Study is non-denominational and welcomes everyone to their public meetings. CBS focuses on the Bible rather than particular denominations beliefs, and seeks to challenge individuals to consider the gospel of Jesus.

University Churches 
CBS also runs five different university churches for various groups of students living in the residential colleges at UNSW. Unichurch UNSW is an English speaking congregation. The Fellowship of Overseas University Students (FOCUS) at UNSW runs four congregations for international students — Mandarin, Cantonese, Indonesian, and International (English).

Affiliations 
CBS should not be confused with the Christian Union (CU), which (as of 2006) was a student-run, Student-Guild-affiliated organisation. CBS and the CU work in concert to conduct ministry on campus. Most members of CU are also members of CBS. CBS is also affiliated with the Australian Fellowship of Evangelical Students (AFES) but is not a member — the AFES group at UNSW is the Christian Union (CU).

References

External links
 CBS website
 Australian Fellowship of Evangelical Students

Christian organisations based in Australia
Student societies in Australia
Evangelical parachurch organizations
University of New South Wales student organisations
Christian organizations established in 1975
Christian organizations established in the 20th century
Student religious organisations in Australia
Biblical exegesis